Frontline is an Australian comedy television series which satirised Australian television current affairs programmes and reporting. It ran for three series of 13 half-hour episodes and was broadcast on ABC TV in 1994, 1995, and 1997.

Series overview

Episodes

Season 1 (1994)

Season 2 (1995)

Season 3 (1997)

References

External links 
 

Lists of Australian comedy television series episodes